Yisrael Medad (born 1947) is an American-born Israeli journalist and author. He was director of Educational Programming and Information resources at the Menachem Begin Heritage Center in Jerusalem until June 2017 and has retired from that position. He is now engaged in editing an English-language annotated anthology of Ze'ev Jabotinsky's writings.

Medad was born to a Jewish family in New York City. As a teenager, he became religious, and attended a religious high school. Medad joined the Betar Zionist youth movement, founded by the Revisionist Zionist leader, Ze'ev Jabotinsky, in 1964. He graduated from Yeshiva University with a BA in Political Science in 1969. In 1970, he and his wife immigrated to Israel. Initially, he lived in the Jewish Quarter of Jerusalem, where he served as Director of the Betar Students' Hostel. Between 1975 and 1977, he served as a Betar representative in the United Kingdom.

In 1981, Medad and his family moved to the Israeli settlement of Shilo. From 1981 to 1992, he served as a parliamentary aide to Knesset member Geula Cohen, and as an Adviser of International Affairs to cabinet minister Yuval Ne'eman.

In 2008, he completed a Master's degree at the Hebrew University of Jerusalem, specializing in Civic and Democracy Education.

Medad is a member of the Executive Board of Israel's Media Watch.

Medad has served as Senior Assistant to the Deputy Minister for Science and as a Legislative Aide to Knesset members. He is a well-known blogger and had contributed columns to the Los Angeles Times, Jerusalem Post, International Herald Tribune and other periodicals. He has been interviewed and profiled in the BBC and Haaretz.

Medad is co-editor of a collection of the Begin-Sadat correspondence that led up to the 1979 Israel-Egypt peace treaty.

Medad and his wife have five children.

References

External links
My Right Word blog
 at Facebook
Success in politics: a view from the Right, Fathom: for a deeper understanding of Israel and the region, 21 January 2013

1947 births
Living people
Israeli political websites
People of the Israeli–Palestinian conflict
Politics of the Middle East
American emigrants to Israel
Israeli Jews
Israeli settlers
Israeli journalists
Israeli male writers
People from New York City
Hebrew University of Jerusalem alumni
Yeshiva University alumni
Zionists
Betar members